The Guardian is a British daily newspaper founded in 1821, with sister publications in Australia and the United States.

The Guardian(s) may also refer to:

Media and entertainment

Newspapers

Australia 

 The Guardian (Swan Hill), a local newspaper, founded in 1888, serving Swan Hill, Victoria, and the surrounding areas. 
 Guardian (Sydney, NSW : 1844), a weekly journal of politics, commerce, agriculture, literature, science and arts for the middle and working classes of New South Wales

Canada
The Guardian (Charlottetown), a daily newspaper of Prince Edward Island, Canada

United Kingdom
theguardian.com, the online resource of The Guardian
Guardian Australia, the online publication of the paper in Australia
Guardian US, the online publication of the paper in the United States
The Guardian (1713), founded in 1713 and running only briefly
The Guardian (Anglican newspaper), an Anglican newspaper published 1846–1951
Cornish Guardian, a local weekly newspaper in Cornwall, England
Farmers Guardian, a weekly newspaper aimed at the British farming industry
Glasgow University Guardian, the student newspaper of the University of Glasgow
Neath Guardian, a local weekly newspaper published 1925–2009 in Neath, Wales
South Wales Guardian, a local newspaper in Ammanford, Wales

United States
 The American Guardian (published 1931–1942), a socialist newspaper in Oklahoma City, Oklahoma 
Boston Guardian (published 1901–1950), an African-American newspaper in Boston, Massachusetts
National Guardian, a New York weekly newspaper founded in 1948 renamed The Guardian in 1967 and running until 1992
San Francisco Bay Guardian, a free alternative newspaper published weekly in San Francisco, California
UCSD Guardian, the student newspaper at the University of California, San Diego

Other countries
Ashburton Guardian, a daily newspaper published in Ashburton, New Zealand
The Guardian (Belize), the official print organ of the United Democratic Party
The Guardian (Nigeria), an independent daily newspaper published in Lagos, Nigeria
The Sunday Guardian, an Indian weekly newspaper based in New Delhi
Trinidad and Tobago Guardian, a daily newspaper in Trinidad and Tobago

Books and comics
The Guardian (novel), a novel by Nicholas Sparks
The Guardians (Christopher novel), a 1970 novel by John Christopher
The Guardians (Abbey novel), a 1982 novel by Lynn Abbey
The Guardians, a series of military science fiction novels by Richard Austin
The Guardians, a novel by Ana Castillo

Card, computer, and video games
The Guardian, an alien being in the Ultima series
The Guardian, the main and player character of The Guardian Legend, a 1988 video game

Films
 The Guardian (1990 film), a horror film directed by William Friedkin
 The Guardian (2006 film), a drama starring Kevin Costner and Ashton Kutcher
 The Guardians (2017 film), a French film
 Guardians (2017 film), a Russian film
 The Guardian, also known as Ana (2020 film), a film starring Andy García

Television
The Guardian (TV series), a 2001–2004 American drama television series starring Simon Baker that aired on CBS
"The Guardian" (Once Upon a Time), an episode of the television series Once Upon a Time
"The Guardian" (Sliders), an episode of the television series Sliders
The Guardian, a character in the 1999 television series The Tribe
The Guardians (British TV series), a 1971 British television drama series
The Guardians (South Korean TV series), a 2017 South Korea television series
The Guardians, a group of characters in the 1984 TV series Challenge of the GoBots

Plays
The Guardian (play), a 1633 Caroline era stage play by Philip Massinger

Other uses
The Guardian (sculpture), a 1995 public artwork by artist Ante Buljan in Redwood City, California, USA
 The Guardian, a 2.2-metre (7 ft 3 in) tall bronze sculpture at the Bull Ring, Birmingham, England
Shoghi Effendi, head of the Baha'i Faith from 1921 until 1957, known by his title of 'The Guardian'

See also

Guardian (disambiguation)
Defender (disambiguation)
Guard (disambiguation)
Guardia (disambiguation)
La Guardia (disambiguation)
Guarda (disambiguation)
The Guard (disambiguation)